This is a list of events from British radio in 1934.

Events
23 February – Edward Elgar dies, leaving unfinished his Symphony No. 3, commissioned by the BBC Symphony Orchestra, who will premiere its realised version in 1998.
6 September – The BBC's most powerful long-wave transmitter, Droitwich Transmitting Station, starts transmitting regularly at 200 kilohertz, following test transmissions from 8 May. From 7 October it takes over from Daventry 5XX as the main station radiating the BBC National Programme.
29 November – Marriage of Prince George, Duke of Kent, to Princess Marina of Greece and Denmark, the first wedding to be broadcast live on radio.
25 December – King George V Christmas Broadcast.

A former London roller skating rink reopens as the BBC's Maida Vale Studios which becomes the home of the BBC Symphony Orchestra.
The Northern Studio Orchestra is renamed the BBC Northern Orchestra.
EKCO introduces its distinctive round bakelite radio cabinets in the United Kingdom.

Births
4 March – John Dunn, radio presenter (died 2004)
5 June – Bryon Butler, radio football correspondent (died 2001)
26 August – Gordon Clough, radio journalist (died 1996)
18 December – Michael Freedland, journalist, biographer and broadcaster in London (You Don't Have To Be Jewish) (died 2018)

References 

 
Years in British radio
Radio